People's Militias (in Slovak Ľudové milície, in Czech Lidové milice), also called The Armed Fist of the Working Class (in Slovak Ozbrojená päsť robotníckej triedy, in Czech Ozbrojená pěst dělnické třídy) was a militia organisation of the Communist Party of Czechoslovakia between 1948 and 1989.

History 
The predecessor of militias were armed groups of factory workers (Závodní milice, factory militias) formed in June 1945 to protect the factories during the post-war chaos. In 1946 they were renamed Závodní stráže (factory guards) and their equipment reduced to pistols.

In the middle of February 1948, the central committee of the Communist Party decided to form armed units from Communist Party members and supporters. On February 21, 1948, these units were renamed Dělnické milice (Worker's Militias). The militias were hastily equipped and set on alert during the communist takeover of power at the end of February. The name was soon changed to People's Militias.

Tasks 
The task of the militias was to protect against guerrillas expected to appear after the takeover, against undercover agents sent to Czechoslovakia and to cooperate with the police and the army. About 3,000 militiamen joined police forces. Non-communists were slowly removed from the militias. The control over the militias went to the Ministry of the Interior.

In 1952 the official status of the militias changed to being the armed part of the Communist Party of Czechoslovakia and control passed to the Communist Party (to the newly established departments at the central committee); also the organisational structure was changed. In 1959 a grey uniform was introduced.

Toward the end of the 1980s, political tensions in Czechoslovakia increased and the militias, equipped with batons, were frequently deployed to disperse demonstrations against the regime. In 1989, 38,985 militiamen participated in this activity.

After the communist party's fall from power at the end of 1989, the militias were dissolved on 21 December 1989.

Numbers and armament
During February 1948 the militias obtained 10,000 rifles and 2,000 submachine guns from the armament factory Zbrojovka Brno. The equipment was continually modernized with sniper rifles, machine guns, mortars, anti-aircraft machine guns and transport vehicles. The ammunition was kept in army stores. During the 1970s recoilless guns and RPG-7 were added among the armament. After dissolution of the militias their equipment was handed over to the army.

Military personnel

Military equipment at 1989
20,067 pistols (with over 4 million rounds)
71,054 submachine guns (with over 62 million rounds)
6,890 machine guns (with over 16 million rounds)
130 anti-aircraft machine guns (over one million rounds)
358 mortars
149 recoilless guns
2,177 trucks and motorcycles
2,031 hand grenades

Rank insignia 1970-1989

See also
Similar formations:
ORMO
Combat Groups of the Working Class
Workers' Militia
Patriotic Guards
Worker-Peasant Red Guards
Red Guards

References

Sources
 Jiří Bílek, Vladimír Pilát: "Závodní, Dělnické a Lidové milice v Československu" in journal "Historie a vojenství", 1995, vol. 3, p. 79 - 106.
 Jan Štaigl: "Ľudové milície na Slovensku - ich vznik a organizačný vývoj do polovice šesťdesiatych rokov" in journal "Vojenská história", 1999, vol 2., p. 41 - 70.

External links
 People's Militias in Czechoslovakia in 1948 - 1989 (in Czech)
 Article in journal História  (in Slovak)
 Lidové Milice (in Czech)
 Uniforminsignia.com People's Militias rank insignia

See also
 Communist Party of Czechoslovakia
 Eastern Bloc politics

Militias
 
Eastern Bloc
Military wings of communist parties
Communist Party of Czechoslovakia